Dioctria hyalipennis is a Holarctic species of robber fly in the family Asilidae.

Description
10 to 14 mm.  
The upper head and vertex are shiny black. The lower face has silvery-white pile. The mystax is white and the short proboscis black. The antennae appears Y-shaped with the segments about equal in length. They are black with short black hair. The neck is obvious and the thorax is raised or humped. It is black with two long indented lines and a faint covering of light yellow pile. Segment 2 (scutellum) is small with a line of yellow pile at base. The thorax sides have a wide stripe of whitish pollen extending along thorax down to front leg.
The wings are hyaline, but appear darker when folded over body. The veins are brown. Halteres light yellow. The front and middle legs are mostly yellow with black streaks on top side and dark tips. The feet are  black with grey pile and yellow spines and toes. The hind legs are black with a swollen 1st foot segment.
The abdomen is shining black. The lower margin of segments have a thin whitish line. The first 4 male segments are very narrow and constricted (appear wavy); the last few segments gradually widen to tip. Female abdomen flat on top side, rounded and orange on underside; much wider and thicker than male, but shorter.

Similar species
Eudioctria albius male has all dark legs.

Biology
The habitats include meadows, hedgerows, forest and field edges with large shrubs and spruce or cedar trees. Adults feed on mostly small wasps and bees like Lasioglossum and Hylaeus. Also reported feeding on small Diptera and pygmy grasshoppers Tetrigidae. Flies May to July

Synonyms and types
Dioctria anomala, Dioctria flavipes, Dioctria frontalis, Dioctria varipes, Dioctria baumhaueri, Dioctria strandi

Holotype as Asilus hyalipennis by Fabricius, 1794. Type Locality: Denmark. Fabricius’ collection is in the University of Copenhagen Zoological Museum, Copenhagen, Denmark. 
Holotype as Dioctria anomala by Macquart, 1826. Type Locality: Unknown. Many Macquart types are in Bigot's collection which is divided between the University Museum at Oxford and the British Museum of Natural History, London, England. Also, Macquart types are scattered among a number of museums, with his personal collection deposited in Lille. 
Holotype as Dioctria flavipes by Meigen, 1804. Type Locality: Netherlands. Baumhauer's collection is split between the Liege and the Leiden Museum, Netherlands.
Holotype as Dioctria frontalis by Meigen, 1804. Type Locality: Unknown. Most of the Meigen collection is now in the Museum National d'Histoire Naturelle in Paris, France. 
Holotype as Dioctria varipes by Meigen, 1820. Type Locality: Unknown. Most of the Meigen collection is now in the Museum National d'Histoire Naturelle in Paris, France. 
Holotype as Dioctria baumhaueri by Meigen, 1820. Type Locality: Netherlands. Baumhauer's collection is split between the Liege and the Leiden Museum, Netherlands.      
Holotype as Dioctria strandi by Duda, 1940. Type Locality: Unknown. Museum unknown.

References

Entomologia Systematica Emendata et Aucta, 1794, Vol. 4 by Fabricius, p. 388.
Klassifikazion und Beschreibung der Europäischen Zweiflügeligen Insekten, 1804 by Meigen, pp. 257–258.
Systematische Beschreibung der Bekannten Europäischen Zweiflügeligen Insekten, 1820, Vol. 2 by Meigen, pp. 245–246.
Insectes Dipteres du Nord de la France, 1826, Vol. 2 by Macquart, p. 17.
Psyche, 1918, Vol. 25: Notes on Genus Dioctria by Johnson, pp. 102 to 103.
Folia Zoologica et Hydrobiologica, 1940, Vol. 10 #1 by Duda, pp. 214–226: Not Available.
The Great Lakes Entomologist, 1975, Vol. 8 #2 by Baker & Fischer, pp. 44–45.
Quaestiones Entomologicae, 1975, Vol. 11: Nearctic species of Dioctria by Adisoemarto & Wood, p. 17.

Notes
Introduced to Boston, Massachusetts area around 1916 from England.

External links
Geller Grim Robberflies of Germany
Images representing Dioctria hyalipennis

Asilidae
Brachyceran flies of Europe